Household economics analyses all the decisions made by a household. These analyses are both at the microeconomic and macroeconomic level. This field analyses the structures of households, the behavior of family members, and their broader influence on society, including: decision making, division of labour within the household, allocation of time to household production, marriage, divorce, fertility, investment in children, and resource allocation.  Malthus and Adam Smith studied the economics of the family in part by looking at the relationship between family size and living wage. 

Since the beginning of the 20th century, most economists have focused on business and monetary dimensions of the economy without consideration of household behaviour. The study of consumption and household production was marginalized by mainstream economics.  Economics theory applied to households, however, can address interactions between the public and private sectors of society in ways that inform tax policies surrounding education, welfare, and retirement benefits.

Household economics can be divided into two models: the unitary model and the collective model.

The unitary model 
The microeconomics approach of the household economics embodied by the unitary model was developed by Gary Becker. He developed the New Household Economics theory (NHE) and the A Treatise on the Family, written in 1981, was one this major work on the family economics and other aspects of the household economics. Becker's work has taken place at a time when the American and more generally Western family has been undergoing profound changes since the Second World War. His model helped to described resource allocation, utility maximization processes and decision making first in the USA and in the other developed countries. 

Economists often assume that agents are rational, i.e. that they always choose the best possible choice given their own interests. Besides consumption decisions are described with the utility function.  
The unitary model described the household acting as a single individual. It does not take into account the plurality of decision-makers. The household utility function is unique and is under a common budget constraint. Becker resolved the problem of conflicts between household members thanks to his altruism model. The household maximize only one individual utility function which is the utility function of the altruistic member. The altruistic member transfers part of his or her resources to other members of the household. Becker said (1974): "the utility function of the 'family' is identical to that of one of its members, not because he (or she) has dictatorial power over the others, but because he (or she!) cares enough about all the others to voluntarily transfer resources to them. Each member of the family can have total freedom of action; in fact, the person transferring the resources would not want to change the consumption of a family member even if he or she had dictatorial power!”. So, the only way for the egoist members (all the other member of the household) to increase its utility function is to contribute to the increase in total household resources. 

However, this theory it has been contradicted by the study by Shelly Lundberg, Robert Pollak and Terence Wales [1997]. They show that the distribution and origin of income influence household consumption choices, which should not be the case in the unitary model. 

Besides Becker described the households as a consumption and production unit. He compares the household as a small factory in his household production function. It produces basic commodities and the household try to choose the best combination of these commodities to maximize its utility function. The production of the households depends on both the time available and the available income. The less time the household spends on leisure activities, the higher the household's income. According to Becker, if the salary of one of the household members increases, it changes the incentives to work in the market and the other members will give up their career to spend their time in consumption activities. However in this theory Becker ignored that people can like their job without regardless of the amount of the salary. 

Becker also developed a general theory of family behavior for decisions concerning marriage, divorce, children and fertility. According to Becker, parents have to decide how many children they want and how much money and time they are willing to spend on them. Becker thinks that when his income increases the household will focus more on the "quality" of the children and therefore the parents prefer to reduce the number of children. His theory explains the decline in fertility in industrialized countries. Regarding marriage, Becker shows that an individual will decide to marry if the marginal cost of marriage is equal to the marginal income of marriage. 

Becker's work has led to a new focus on the analysis of households and their decisions. However, his analysis present some weakness and it lacks theoretical support. First Becker neglects intrahousehold inequality but also the existence of power. The unitary model has been very strongly criticized by feminist economists.  

The non-unitary household models developed from the 1990s onwards therefore set out to compensate for the weaknesses of the unitary approach.

The collective model 
The basic principles of these models are to characterize the preferences of each individual and to characterize the distribution factors. The collective model, unlike the unitary model, acknowledges the existence of inequalities within the household. 

The collective approach was first developed by Pierre-Andre Chiappori (1992). There are two approach of collective models: cooperative, where household decisions are Pareto efficient, and noncooperative, based on Nash's equilibrium.  

The non-cooperative is based on non-cooperative provision of public goods. Each member has separate economies within the household. The provision of public goods is inefficient. The household members are not able to enter into efficient contract with each other.

In the cooperative model household decisions are Pareto efficient. The well-being of one household member cannot be increased without reducing the well-being of another member in the same household. maxUa +μUb       μ= pareto weightEach member has its own preferences and an individual utility function. Under this model, the total income is divided among household members according to a sharing rule and then each one maximizes its utility on its own. The sharing rules are the basis for decisional process.

See also
 Breadwinner model
Family economics
 Outline of relationships
Standard budget
 Jacob Mincer
 Grossbard-Shechtman
 Parental dividend
 Human capital

References 

Family economics

GARY S. BECKER (1981) "Treatise on the Family", Harvard University Press

Nicolas Frémeaux  "Essays on Family Economics" http://piketty.pse.ens.fr/files/Fremeaux2013These.pdf

Pierré-Andre Chiappori, Monica Costa Dias and Costas Meghir (2015) "THE MARRIAGE MARKET, LABOR SUPPLY AND EDUCATION CHOICE", Working Paper 21004, NATIONAL BUREAU OF ECONOMIC RESEARCH https://www.nber.org/papers/w21004.pdf

Pierre-Andre Chiappori, Lawrence Haddad, John Hoddinott, Ravi Kanbur  "Unitary versus Collective Modelsof the Household: Time to Shift the Burden of Proof?" POLICY RESEARCH WORKING PAPER 1217, http://documents.worldbank.org/curated/en/514541468766231479/pdf/multi0page.pdf